Javier 'Javi' Cantero de la Puente (born 22 January 1988) is a Spanish footballer who plays as a left back.

Club career
Born in Granada, Andalusia, Cantero graduated from RCD Espanyol's youth academy, and made his senior debut with the reserves in the 2007–08 season, in Segunda División B. On 22 July 2009 he signed for Atlético Madrid, but again featured solely for the B-team also in the third level.

On 6 August 2012, Cantero moved to fellow league side Real Oviedo. After featuring regularly for the Asturians during his only season, he moved abroad for the first time, joining Cyprus' Enosis Neon Paralimni FC.

Cantero returned to Spain on 23 July 2014, signing for Segunda División club CD Mirandés. He played his first match as a professional on 24 August, featuring 90 minutes in the 0–0 home draw against CD Lugo. He scored his only league goal the following 16 May, but in a 2–3 home loss to FC Barcelona B.

Released in June 2016, Cantero subsequently joined Recreativo de Huelva.

References

External links

1988 births
Living people
Footballers from Granada
Spanish footballers
Association football defenders
Segunda División players
Segunda División B players
Tercera División players
RCD Espanyol B footballers
Atlético Madrid B players
Real Oviedo players
CD Mirandés footballers
Recreativo de Huelva players
Burgos CF footballers
CD Ebro players
Cypriot First Division players
Enosis Neon Paralimni FC players
Spain youth international footballers
Spanish expatriate footballers
Expatriate footballers in Cyprus
Spanish expatriate sportspeople in Cyprus